Volley or Volly may refer to:

People
 Volly De Faut (1904–1973), American jazz reed player
 Paul Volley (born 1971), English rugby union player

Sports
Volley (association football), an air-borne strike in association football
In some racket sports; striking a ball before it bounces on the ground
Volley (tennis)
Volley (pickleball)

Volleyball teams
 Paris Volley, a professional volleyball team based in Paris, France
 Piemonte Volley, a professional volleyball team based in Cuneo, Italy
 Trentino Volley, a professional volleyball team based in Trento, Italy
 Vicenza Volley, a professional volleyball club based in Vicenza, Italy
 Volley Bergamo, a women's volleyball team based in Bergamo, Italy
 Volley Treviso, a professional volleyball team based in Treviso, Italy

Other uses
 Volley fire, the simultaneous firing of a number of projectiles or missiles
 Volley (shoe), a brand of sandshoe popular in Australia

 Volley (film), a 2014 Spanish comedy film